The 1913 Idaho football team represented the University of Idaho in the 1913 college football season. Idaho was led by ninth-year head coach John G. Griffith. The two home games were played in Moscow, but off campus; the new MacLean Field opened the following season.

In the season opener in Spokane, Idaho whipped   then posted a second-straight win over Washington State in the Battle of the Palouse, 

Rival Montana was not played this season, and Idaho's three losses were all in Oregon, concluding on New Year's Day against the Multnomah Athletic Club in Portland.

It was Griffith's penultimate year as head coach; he left for Oklahoma A&M (now Oklahoma State) in Stillwater after the 1914 season.

Schedule

 One game was played on Friday (at home against Washington State) and two away games on Thursday(Oregon Agricultural in Corvallis on Thanksgiving, Multnomah A.C. in Portland on New Year's Day)

References

External links
 Gem of the Mountains: 1915 University of Idaho yearbook (spring 1914) – 1913 football season
 Go Mighty Vandals – 1913 football season
 Idaho Argonaut – student newspaper – 1913 editions

Idaho
Idaho Vandals football seasons
Idaho football